Sir Sidney Wadsworth (21 December 1888 — 2 March 1976) was a British judge who served in the Indian Civil Service.

He was educated at Loughborough Grammar School; Sorbonne, Paris; Jesus College, Cambridge and the Middle Temple.

He joined the ICS in 1913.  In 1916 he married Olive Florence Clegg (known as Florence), daughter of Sir Robert Clegg and they had one son and two daughters.  He was a judge on the High Court at Madras from 1935 to 1947. He was made a knight bachelor in 1946, when his wife was also made an MBE. He retired in 1947 to the Isle of Man.

He published his memoirs entitled Lo! The Poor Indian.

References 

 Who Was Who.

1888 births
1976 deaths
British India judges
People educated at Loughborough Grammar School
University of Paris alumni
Alumni of Jesus College, Cambridge
Members of the Middle Temple
Indian Civil Service (British India) officers
Knights Bachelor
Judges of the Madras High Court
20th-century Indian judges
British people in colonial India